The 2021–22 Bowling Green Falcons men's ice hockey season was the 53rd season of play for the program and the 43rd season in the Central Collegiate Hockey Association. The Falcons represented Bowling Green State University and were led by third-year head coach Ty Eigner.

Season
Bowling Green joined with six other members of the WCHA to restart the CCHA for the 2021–22 season. Before the CCHA resumed play, an eighth member, former NCAA Division III member St. Thomas, joined the league.

After narrowly missing out on the NCAA tournament the year before, Bowling Green got a good start to the season, going undefeated through their first five games. The Falcons ran into a bit of trouble when they started playing ranked teams, losing 7 consecutive games against top-20 opponents. The losses didn't put Bowling Green in good standing with the rankings and the Falcons remained unlikely to earn a berth despite getting up to a 13–9–3 record.

In the last nine games, however, the team's offense all but vanished and the Falcons went 1–8 to end the regular season. Despite all the momentum moving against them, Bowling Green managed to win the first game in the playoff series against Bemidji State. Unfortunately, they weren't able to repeat the performance and their season ended on a down note.

Departures

Recruiting

Roster
As of August 20, 2021.

Standings

Schedule and results

|-
!colspan=12 style=";" | Exhibition

|-
!colspan=12 style=";" | Regular Season

|-
!colspan=12 style=";" | 

|-
!colspan=12 style=";" |

Scoring statistics

Goaltending statistics

Rankings

Note: USCHO did not release a poll in week 24.

Awards and honors

References

2021-22
Bowling Green
Bowling Green
Bowling Green
Bowling Green